Waylon Glenn Prather (born February 16, 1985) is an American football coach and former punter who coached wide receivers and tight ends coach at Cabrillo College and was the head coach at Harbor High School. He played college football at San Jose State and was signed by the New Orleans Saints as an undrafted free agent in 2008.

Prather has also been a member of the New York Jets.

Early life and college
Born in Felton, California, Prather graduated from San Lorenzo Valley High School in Felton in 2003. Prather redshirted 2003 and punted for the San Jose State Spartans football team from 2004 to 2007 and was part of the 2006 New Mexico Bowl championship team. He was a Western Athletic Conference Special Teams Player of the Week in 2005 and first-team All-WAC pick in 2006. Prather majored in kinesiology in San Jose State University and was a middle school student teacher in the spring of 2007 Prather graduated from San Jose State with a Bachelor of Science degree in kinesiology in May 2008.

Professional career

New Orleans Saints
Prather was signed by the Saints as an undrafted free agent on May 5, 2008, but was waived by the team on August 25.

New York Jets
Prather was signed to the Jets' practice squad on September 17, 2008. He was released a week later on September 24.

Arizona Cardinals
Prather was signed to a future contract by the Arizona Cardinals on December 30, 2008.

Post-playing career
Prather became a personal trainer with LA Fitness and lived in San Diego County, California. He then moved to Santa Cruz County and began substitute teaching.

In 2012, Prather became wide receivers and tight ends coach at Cabrillo College, a junior college in Aptos, California.

Prather is now a physical education teacher at College Connection Academy in San Jose teaching 7th and 8th graders.

References

1985 births
Living people
American exercise instructors
American football punters
Cabrillo Seahawks football coaches
San Jose State Spartans football players
High school football coaches in California
People from Aptos, California
People from Felton, California
Players of American football from California